Pycnodontoids were "deep-bodied and laterally compressed fish" whose tooth morphology suggest that they preyed on small contemporary invertebrates. They may have resembled modern butterfly fish. So far, pycnodontoids are represented by a single specimen from Dinosaur National Monument in Utah.

See also
 Paleobiota of the Morrison Formation#Fish

References

Jurassic fish